Nasrin Sporting Club is a Bangladeshi Women's association football from Dhaka. It was established in 2013 ahead of 2012–13 Bangladesh Women's Football League. Ongoing    season is the club second participating season.

History

Current squad

Competitive record

Head coach record

Club management

Current technical staff

Board of Directors
As of 5 November 2022

References

2013 establishments in Bangladesh
Association football clubs established in 2013
Women's football clubs in Bangladesh